Michael George Heal (born 8 September 1948) is a former English first-class cricketer who played for Oxford University in the late 1960s and early 1970s, winning a Blue in 1970 and 1972. He also played for Gloucestershire's Second XI, and had one List A outing for their first team in 1973. He was born in Bristol.

As a career batting average of under 16 shows, Heal was generally unsuccessful as a batsman, but against Warwickshire in April 1972 he made an unbeaten 124, the highest score by far of his first-class career, to help set up a two-wicket victory. His only other half-century was 64 against Glamorgan in 1970.

He also played rugby union for Oxford University, winning a Blue for that as well.

References

External links
 

1948 births
Living people
English cricketers
Gloucestershire cricketers
Oxford University cricketers
Cricketers from Bristol
Alumni of St Edmund Hall, Oxford